"Psychotropic Substances Act" may refer to several national laws designed to fulfill treaty obligations under the Convention on Psychotropic Substances:
Psychotropic Substances Act (United States)
Psychotropic Substances Act (Thailand)

See also
Narcotic Drugs and Psychotropic Substances Act (disambiguation)
Psychotropic substances